Tom Slingsby  (born 5 September 1984) is a successful Australian competitive sailor. Slingsby's first successes came sailing Laser dinghys, where he won three consecutive world championships and the 2012 Olympic gold medal. Slingsby was the strategist for the America's Cup-winning Team Oracle USA in 2013. In 2016 he skippered the winner-of-line honours in the Sydney to Hobart Yacht Race line. Following this he skippered the Australian team in the inaugural SailGP competition.

Career highlights
2007 – Won the Laser dinghy world championships.

2008 – Ranked number one in the Laser dinghy class prior to the 2008 Summer Olympics Laser competition but finished 22nd overall. 

2008 – Won Australian Sailing Male Sailor of the Year Award 

2010 – Won the Laser dinghy world championships at Hayling Island, UK. He was also named the male ISAF World Sailor of the Year.

2010 – Won the Etchells Class World Championship as crew with Andrew Palfry, with fellow America's Cup legend John Bertrand helming.

2011 – Won the Laser ISAF World Sailing Championships at Fremantle, Australia.

2011 – Won Australian Sailing Male Sailor of the Year Award 

2012 – Won the Laser dinghy world championship at Boltenhagen Germany for his fifth world title

2012 – Won the Men's Laser Gold Medal at the 2012 Summer Olympics in London.

2012 – Won the Australian Institute of Sport Athlete of the Year Award with swimmer Alicia Coutts.

2012 – Won Australian Sailing Male Sailor of the Year Award 

2013 – Won the 34th America's Cup as the strategist in Oracle Team USA. Re-signed with Oracle for their defence of the cup.

2016 – Won the Sydney Hobart Yacht Race skippering the supermaxi yacht Perpetual LOYAL.

2019 – Won the inaugural SailGP skippering the Australian Team sailing F50 foiling catamarans.

2019 – Won the Chandler Macleod Moth Worlds

2020 – Won Australian Sailing Male Sailor of the Year Award 

2021 – Won the World Sailor of the Year Awards.

2022 – Won Australian Sailing Male Sailor of the Year Award 

In December 2013 Slingsby was a crew member aboard racing supermaxi yacht Perpetual Loyal in the 2013 Sydney to Hobart Yacht Race, with his other celebrity crew members, Karl Stefanovic, Larry Emdur, Phil Waugh, Jude Bolton and Guillaume Brahimi.

Slingsby received the Medal of the Order of Australia (OAM) in the 2014 Australia Day Honours for "service to sport as a gold medallist at the London 2012 Olympic Games".

Slingsby, as the Captain of Team Australia, won the 2019 season 1 of Sail GP

References

External links 
 
 
 
 
 "Australian Olympic Committee profile" olympics.com.au
 ILCA "Laser Standard World Championship 2012" laserinternational.org
 Sponsor Hobart Yacht Race

1984 births
Living people
Australian Institute of Sport sailors
Australian male sailors (sport)
ISAF World Sailor of the Year (male)
World champions in sailing for Australia
Etchells class world champions
Laser class world champions
Moth class world champions
2017 America's Cup sailors
2013 America's Cup sailors
Recipients of the Medal of the Order of Australia
SailGP
Olympic sailors of Australia
Olympic gold medalists for Australia
Olympic medalists in sailing
Sailors at the 2008 Summer Olympics – Laser
Sailors at the 2012 Summer Olympics – Laser
Medalists at the 2012 Summer Olympics